Yeni Berenice Reynoso Gómez de Patiño (born 25 October 1982 in Luperón) is a Dominican Republic lawyer, former  public prosecutor of the Province of Santiago, and current fiscal procurator of the National District of the Dominican Republic since 2012.

Reynoso is known as the first woman in Santiago to have been public prosecutor and also the youngest to hold this position in the Dominican Republic.

References

External links 
 Twitter
 Facebook

1982 births
Dominican Republic women lawyers
People from Puerto Plata Province
Living people
21st-century Dominican Republic lawyers
Female justice ministers